The Erosion of Childhood is a 1982 book about early childhood schooling in the United States by Valerie Polakow Suransky. It is based on a study of five nursery and preschools across social class lines. The book was published by University of Chicago Press.

Notes

References

External links 

 

1982 non-fiction books
American non-fiction books
Books about education
English-language books
University of Chicago Press books